Cella's is a brand of cherry cordial confection marketed by Chicago-based Tootsie Roll Industries, who purchased the brand in 1985. They were originally introduced in 1864.

Description 
Cella's is a brand of cherry cordial confection. The cordials are cherries and liquid enrobed in either milk chocolate or dark chocolate.

History 
Cella's cherry cordial was introduced in 1864, with large-scale production starting in 1929. The brand was purchased by Chicago-based Tootsie Roll Industries in 1985.

See also
 List of confectionery brands

References

Tootsie Roll Industries brands
Candy
1985 mergers and acquisitions
1864 introductions